Opéra bouffe (plural: opéras bouffes) is a genre of late 19th-century French operetta, closely associated with Jacques Offenbach, who produced many of them at the Théâtre des Bouffes-Parisiens, inspiring the genre's name.

Opéras bouffes are known for elements of comedy, satire, parody and farce. The most famous examples are La belle Hélène, Barbe-bleue (Bluebeard), La Vie parisienne, La Périchole and La Grande-Duchesse de Gérolstein.

Sources

Bartlet, M. Elizabeth C.: "Opéra bouffe" Stanley Sadie (ed.), The New Grove Dictionary of Opera (London, 1992). 

Opera genres
Opera terminology